Sílvio Manfredi (born 4 March 1964) is a Brazilian water polo player. He competed in the men's tournament at the 1984 Summer Olympics.

References

1964 births
Living people
Brazilian male water polo players
Olympic water polo players of Brazil
Water polo players at the 1984 Summer Olympics
Water polo players from Rio de Janeiro (city)
20th-century Brazilian people